Little Miss Perfect is an American reality television series that follows girls in the same beauty pageant each week. The pageant is hosted by Michael Galanes with judges Deedy Melanson, Nyahsha Zimucha, David Gilbert, and sometimes Janet McCullogh.

The show, like Toddlers & Tiaras, is aired without narration to avoid judgment. Unlike Toddlers & Tiaras, Little Miss Perfect has only two girls instead of three families and there is only one girl awarded a crown, sash, and money at the pageant.

Season 1 premiered on February 18, 2009, and season 2 debuted on January 12, 2010.

Episodes

Season 1

Season 2

References

External links

2009 American television series debuts
2000s American reality television series
2010s American reality television series
2010 American television series endings
Television series about children